Paragomphus alluaudi is a species of dragonfly in the family Gomphidae. It is found in Angola, Ethiopia, Kenya, and Tanzania. Its natural habitats are subtropical or tropical dry shrubland, subtropical or tropical moist shrubland, and rivers. It is threatened by habitat loss.

References

Sources

Gomphidae
Taxonomy articles created by Polbot
Insects described in 1915